United States Army Reserve Legal Command (USARLC) is headquartered in Gaithersburg, Maryland, and was activated on 16 September 2009. It is part of United States Army Reserve Command.

Mission and support

The U.S. Army Reserve Legal Command is headquartered at the Major General Benjamin L. Hunton Memorial United States Army Reserve Center at 8791 Snouffer School Road in Gaithersburg, Maryland.
The mission of the U.S. Army Reserve Legal Command (USARLC) is to ensure the availability of legal forces able to support national strategy in times of peace and war. It is composed of nearly 1,500 Soldiers and Civilians. USARLC is responsible for all of the operational tasks for the subordinate units that report to USARLC. These operational tasks include training, equipping, managing, supporting, mobilizing and retaining Soldiers under USARLC.
USARLC is subordinate to the U.S. Army Reserve Command.

Organizational structure
The USARLC is composed predominantly of U.S. Army Reserve Soldiers. These personnel include judge advocates, warrant officers, paralegal noncommissioned officers, junior enlisted personnel, and civilian employees.

The USARLC has 28 subordinate units located in 41 states and 104 cities including Puerto Rico. These units are called Legal Operations Detachments (LOD).

Leadership
Brigadier General Gerald R. Krimbill is the commanding general.  The command chief warrant officer is Chief Warrant Officer Four Hector X. Colon. The senior non-commissioned officer is Command Sergeant Major Carlos V. Arrieta Jr.

History
USARLC was activated on 16 September 2009. The first commanding general for USARLC was Brigadier General Gill Beck, who served from 16 September 2009 until 29 September 2011.

See also
 Judge Advocate General's Corps, United States Army

References

External links
Official Site
UCMJ Articles
Reinert Takes Charge of Army Reserve Legal Command
United States Army Reserve Legal Command conducts Military Justice and Trial Advocacy Training Conference for Legal Administrators
United States Army Reserve Legal Command at the United States Army Institute of Heraldry

United States Army Judge Advocate General's Corps
United States Army Z
United States military law